Eudokia Makrembolitissa was a Byzantine empress by her successive marriages to Constantine X Doukas and Romanos IV Diogenes. She acted as regent of her minor son, Michael VII in 1067, and resigned her regency by marriage to Romanos IV Diogenes. When he was deposed in 1071 she resumed the regency for her sons, but was soon forced to resign again.

Because she essentially ruled in her own right during her sole regencies and retained the title of empress, several modern scholars consider Eudokia to have been empress regnant in 1067 and some also in 1071.

Background and early life 
Eudokia Makrembolitissa was the daughter of John Makrembolites and a niece of Michael I Cerularius, the patriarch of Constantinople, whose sister had married Makrembolites. John, who belonged to the aristocracy of Constantinople, allied with Cerularius in 1040 to conspirate against Emperor Michael IV, but their plan was stopped soon after. The birth date of Eudokia is unknown, but scholars often place it on  1030. Some authors give her a lifespan of 1021–1096, but this is not corroborated by other sources. Eudokia married Constantine X Doukas sometime before his accession in 1059, probably  1049, when Constantine was 43 years old. She was Constantine's second wife, as his first one, a daughter of Duke Constantine Dalassenos, died soon after their marriage. By 1059 they already had 3 children: the future Michael VII, an unnamed son who died young and Andronikos Doukas.

Empress 

Constantine X Doukas was crowned emperor on 23 November 1059, the day after Isaac I Komnenos' abdication. Eudokia was crowned augusta soon after, probably on the same year. They had a fourth son around this time, Konstantios Doukas, who was crowned before his brother Michael. When Constantine fell ill in October 1066, he appointed caesar John Doukas and patriarch John VIII Xiphilinos as co-regents. Eudokia was meant to only take care of Michael and Konstantios, but Constantine knew that she had larger ambitions. Constantine died the next year, on 23 May 1067.

Some historians regard Eudokia as a empress regnant who actually ruled in her own right, rather than just a regent. According to the contemporary Michael Psellos, Eudokia "succeeded [Constantine X] as supreme ruler, she did not hand over the government to others... she assumed control of the whole administration in person. Her status as a ruler is reflected in her coinage and public iconography. For example, she sometimes appeared on silver and copper coins without her sons, which was very unusual. One inscription on a silver reliquary calls her "Great Empress of the Romans" (megalē basilis tōn Romaiōn), suggesting that she had a higher status than her sons (who were only basileus). Michael VII was "already long past his boyhood" by this time, but nevertheless "left the whole administration to his mother". Some authors argue that he had some type of mental disability.

Eudokia had sworn on Constantine's deathbed not to remarry, and she even made the oath in the presence of patriarch John VIII Xiphilinos. However, she knew that her position of power could be compromised if she continued to wield power alone. She then chose Romanos IV Diogenes, a general who had great popularity with the army. This decision was quite controversial, as Romanos had been accused of conspiring with the Hungarians shortly before Constantine X's death. Eudokia hoped that his skills and leadership would stop the advance of the Seljuk Turks in the East. On 25 December, Eudokia rewarded Romanos with the titles magistros and stratelates in preparation for his coronation. However, they still needed the approval of the patriarch of Constantinople. According to some sources, Eudokia tricked John VIII into believing that she would marry one of his brothers. John VIII accepted the offer and canceled the oath. The marriage and imperial coronation took place on 1 January 1068, to the surprise of the patriarch and other officials.

With her new husband's assistance, Eudokia was able to dispel the impending danger. She had two sons with Romanos IV, Nikephoros and Leo. Another of Eudokia and Constantine's sons, Andronikos Doukas, was also made co-emperor by Romanos IV, although he had been excluded from power by his own father, mother, and brothers. He was probably crowned too in 1068, although he is ignored by contemporary chronicles. Contemporary coinage seems to depict Romanos as inferior to Michael and his brothers, and thus inferior to the empress. He is sometimes not even called "emperor", as some tetarteron only call him despotes and reserve the title basileus for Eudokia. According to Michael Psellos, she explicitly referred to him as "a subject, not a ruler." Romanos IV, however, soon started to act independently of her, even starting to resent her. Discontent was also shared by a faction of the Senate and army, with John Doukas at the head.

On 26 August 1071, Romanos IV faced Alp Arslan, sultan of the Seljuk Empire, at the decisive Battle of Manzikert. The Byzantine army was destroyed and the emperor himself was captured, partly because of the treachery of general Andronikos, John Doukas's son. The news reached Constantinople a few days later, causing much shock in the populace. On 1 October the Senate declared Romanos IV deposed and proclaimed Eudokia and Michael VII as joint rulers. Some sources state that Eudokia was already planning on deposing her husband, but this is very unlikely. The new regime only lasted one month, when Eudokia's opposition became strong enough to depose her, especially after news of Romanos release arrived at the capital. Michael VII was then proclaimed sole autokrator by John Doukas, who forced Eudokia to retire to a monastery as a nun.

Later life 

Eudokia continued to be influential even after her exile in 1071. Soon after her deposition, she allied with Anna Dalassene, a sister-in-law of Isaac I Komnenos who had also been exiled, to restore Romanos IV and depose John Doukas. However, Doukas soon fell from grace as a result of the schemes of eunuch Nikephoritzes, who was close to the Komnenos family. Eudokia later performed a memorable funeral and burial for Romanos IV, who died on 4 August 1072.

After Michael VII was deposed in 1078 by Nikephoros III Botaneiates, Eudokia was recalled to Constantinople by the new emperor, who offered to marry her. This plan did not come to pass, mainly due to the opposition of John Doukas, who returned to power after Nikephoritzes's exile. However, Nikephoros still sent her many rewards and gifts of gratitude. Her date of death is unknown, but it was sometime after the accession of Alexios I Komnenos in 1081. Her last known action is the adoption of one of the cousins of Patriarch Michael I Cerularius.

Attributed to Eudokia is a dictionary of history and mythology, called  (i.e., Collection or Bed of Violets). It is prefaced by an address to her husband, Romanos Diogenes, and the work is described as "a collection of genealogies of gods, heroes, and heroines, of their metamorphoses, and of the fables and stories respecting them found in the ancients; containing also notices of various philosophers". However, the book is now thought to be a modern (16th-century) compilation, falsely attributed to Eudokia, and compiled by the counterfeiter Constantine Paleocappa  1540. The sources from which the work was compiled include Diogenes Laërtius and the Suda.

Notes

References

Bibliography 
Primary sources

 

Secondary sources

 
 
 
 
 
 
 
 
 
 
 
 
 
 
 
 

1030 births
Byzantine Empresses regnant
Remarried royal consorts
11th-century viceregal rulers
11th-century women writers
Doukid dynasty
11th-century Byzantine empresses
Byzantine women writers
Eudokia
Augustae
11th-century Byzantine writers
11th-century Byzantine nuns
Byzantine regents
Female regents
11th-century women rulers
Mothers of Byzantine emperors